Alpine Lake is a reservoir in Marin County, California. Formed by Alpine Dam, it provides water to the Marin Municipal Water District. Below the dam lies Kent Lake. Alpine Lake is to the west of Bon Tempe Lake. Fishing is allowed, and Largemouth Bass, Smallmouth Bass, and trout can be caught. Boats are not allowed on this lake.

Alpine Dam
Alpine Dam (national ID number: CA00204) is a gravity dam which was completed in 1917.

Hiking
Kent Trail along Alpine Lake : A trail that takes place just off the shores of Alpine Lake, up through a redwood forest onto a manzanita-covered ridge with great views.  
−Distance: 5.2-mile lollipop loop
−Difficulty: Moderate
−Dogs: Allowed on leash

See also
Lake Alpine
List of dams and reservoirs in California
List of lakes in California
List of lakes in the San Francisco Bay Area

Notes

Reservoirs in Marin County, California
Mount Tamalpais
Reservoirs in California
Reservoirs in Northern California